The saffron shiner (Notropis rubricroceus) is a North American species of ray-finned fish in the genus Notropis. It is found in cold, clear rocky streams and creeks in the Tennessee River drainage. Characteristics are a relatively deep body, dorsal fin origin above back half of pelvic fin base, medium-sized eye, narrow rounded snout, sub-terminal mouth, elongate spot at base of tail fin, dark side stripe on back half of body, olive back, silver sides, white belly, fins pale except for black mark on tail fin, and breeding males will be bright red with blue stripe on the side. When spawning the females release approximately 440 to 1200 eggs and they either spawn over a chub nest or in gravel runs without a nest. Food sources for saffron shiners consist of insects, worms, spiders, plants and algae.

References 

Notropis
Fish described in 1868